Tune-Up! is an album by saxophonist Sonny Stitt recorded in 1972 and released on the Cobblestone label.

Reception
AllMusic reviewed the album, stating: "Sonny Stitt recorded over 100 albums as a leader and several dozen in a quartet setting in his productive career, but this one ranks at the top. The bebop tenor and alto stylist is very inspired by the top-notch rhythm section".

Track listing 
 "Tune-Up" (Miles Davis) – 4:53  
 "I Can't Get Started" (Vernon Duke, Ira Gershwin) – 5:32  
 "Idaho" (Jesse Stone) – 4:29  
 "Just Friends" (John Klenner, Sam M. Lewis) – 4:28  
 "Blues for Prez and Bird" (Sonny Stitt) – 4:30  
 "Groovin' High" (Dizzy Gillespie) – 4:24  
 "I Got Rhythm" (George Gershwin, Ira Gershwin) – 9:41

Personnel 
Sonny Stitt – alto saxophone, tenor saxophone
Barry Harris – piano
Sam Jones – bass 
Alan Dawson – drums

References 

1972 albums
Cobblestone Records albums
Sonny Stitt albums
Albums produced by Don Schlitten